The  narrow gauge Danville, Olney and Ohio River Railroad ran south from Sidell to West Liberty, Illinois and existed in the late 19th century.

History
The original proposal for the railroad was for a  route from Danville through Hume to the Ohio River. The portion running through Hume was completed and put into service in 1881.

The north–south railroad was known by the following official and unofficial names:
 Kansas and Sidell
 K & S
 Old Dody
 Dog River
 Crab Oyster
 Chicago & Ohio River
 C & O

As the roadbed decayed, the line carried freight at just . Derailments were frequent nonetheless.

I.N. Coolley served as President of the railroad in its later years.

The rolling stock of the railroad consisted of one caboose and two locomotives, numbered 200 and 201, which were former switch engines purchased from the Chicago and Eastern Illinois Railroad. Cars were rented from major railroads.

In 1886, the company was sold at foreclosure and acquired by the Chicago and Ohio River Railroad, a predecessor of the Illinois Central Railroad. However, when that company's successor, the Peoria, Decatur and Evansville Railway, went bankrupt, the line was resold in 1898 to the Indiana, Decatur and Western Railway, a predecessor of the Cincinnati, Indianapolis and Western Railroad (acquired by the Baltimore and Ohio Railroad in 1927).

In 1938, the line was abandoned by legal means. The scrap iron was removed by Hyman Michaels.

George H. Culp of Montezuma, Indiana, wrote a poem, entitled "The Old Road Passes", which describes the "Old Dog River line."

See also
Nantucket Central Railroad Company

References

 The Hume Centennial History Committee. (1973). Hume: 1873-1973. Potomac, Illinois: Wescove Press.

External links
 Map of the railroad from the Library of Congress

Defunct Illinois railroads
Predecessors of the Baltimore and Ohio Railroad
Railway companies established in 1869
Railway companies disestablished in 1886
Narrow gauge railroads in Illinois
3 ft gauge railways in the United States
1869 establishments in Illinois